Berdiansk Raion or Berdyansk Raion is one of the five raions (districts) of Zaporizhzhia Oblast in southern Ukraine. The administrative center of the region is Berdiansk. The raion has access to the northern coast of the Sea of Azov. The population is 

On 18 July 2020, as part of the administrative reform of Ukraine, the number of raions of Zaporizhzhia Oblast was reduced to five, and the area of Berdiansk Raion was significantly expanded.  The January 2020 estimate of the raion population was

References

Raions of Zaporizhzhia Oblast
Berdiansk Raion
1923 establishments in Ukraine